Katie A. McLaughlin a clinical psychologist and expert on how stress, trauma, and other adverse events, such as natural disorders or pandemics, affect behavioral and brain development during childhood and adolescence. McLaughlin is a Professor of Psychology at Harvard University.

McLaughlin received the Chaim and Bela Danieli Young Professional Award from the International Society for Traumatic Stress Studies in 2013 and the Susan Nolen-Hoeksema Early Career Award from the Society for the Science of Clinical Psychology in 2014.  In 2016, McLaughlin won the Distinguished Scientific Early Career Contributions to Psychology Award from the American Psychological Association and the Klerman Prize for Exceptional Clinical Research from the Brain & Behavior Research Foundation.

Biography 
McLaughlin received her B.A. degree with Honors in Psychology at University of Virginia in 2002. Her honors thesis research was supervised by Robert Emery, who opened the doors to research on stress and child adversity. McLaughlin earned an M.S. degree in Psychology at Pennsylvania State University in 2004. At Penn State, she worked with Thomas Borkovec on studies of worry and rumination and with Douglas Mennin on studies of personality and anxiety disorders.

McLaughlin went on to complete a joint Ph.D in Clinical Psychology and Chronic Disease Epidemiology at Yale University in 2008 under the direction of Susan Nolen-Hoeksema. While at Yale, McLaughlin collaborated with Nolen-Hoeksema on research examining the role of rumination in the development of anxiety and depression in adolescents and adults.

McLaughlin completed post-doctoral work at the Harvard School of Public Health. At Harvard, Charles Nelson influenced McLaughlin to conduct research on child adversity that included policy and clinical implications. Ronald Kessler and Karestan Koenen introduced her to epidemiological approaches. She was an assistant professor at the University of Washington before joining the faculty of Harvard University.

McLaughlin was recipient of a Jacobs Foundation fellowship and a MERIT Award from the National Institute of Mental Health.

Research 
McLaughlin works in the area of affective neuroscience and developmental psychology, concentrating on how situations involving childhood adversity, trauma, and stress influence cognitive, emotional and neurobiological development in young children and teenagers. She has worked on large-scale studies linking childhood adversity and adult psychopathology including the World Health Organization (WHO) World Mental Health Surveys. and the National Comorbidity Survey. The results of her research indicate that adversities during childhood and adolescence heighten individuals' risk of developing mental disorders, including major depression and anxiety disorders.

Representative publications

References

External links 
Faculty profile at Harvard University
Stress and development lab
Katie A. McLaughlin publications indexed by Google Scholar

Neuroscientists
American women psychologists
Harvard University faculty
Yale University alumni
Pennsylvania State University alumni
University of Virginia alumni
Living people
Year of birth missing (living people)
American clinical psychologists